The Tamil Youth Organization (TYO) is an international organization with branches in the UK, Canada, Australia, France, Norway and several other nations. They organize cultural, sports events and also follows a Tamil nationalist approach and helped organize a referendum among the Tamil diaspora and support an independent Tamil Eelam.

The Tamil Youth Organization has been designated as a "terrorist entity" by the Sri Lankan government.

References

External links
Tamil Youth Organisation United Kingdom
TYO Canada
Tamil Youth Organisation Germany
TYO Switzerland
TYO Norway

Sri Lankan Tamil politics
Sri Lankan Tamil diaspora
Tamil Eelam
Sri Lankan Tamil nationalism
Organisations designated as terrorist by Sri Lanka